Suomen Musiikki (KHY Suomen Musiikki Oy) is a Finnish independent record label formed by Kari Hynninen in 2005. The company's main business is the sound record publishing. The founder and CEO of the label is Kari Hynninen.

Artists 
The most known musicians (bands) on the label are:
 45 Degree Woman
 Amberian Dawn
 The Crash
Dalindèo
 Dingo
 Egotrippi
 Eternal Tears of Sorrow
 Fork
 Hay And Stone
 John McGregor
 Jukka Poika
 
 Lighthouse Project
 Norther
 Pelle Miljoona United
 Siiri Nordin
 Tacere
 Starflower

See also 
 List of record labels

References

External links 
 
 

Finnish independent record labels
Record labels established in 2005